Mohamed Abdelhafid Henni is the Algerian Minister of Agriculture and Rural Development. He was appointed as minister on 9 September 2022.

References 

Living people
21st-century Algerian politicians
Algerian politicians
Government ministers of Algeria
Year of birth missing (living people)